The Rural Municipality of Griffin No. 66 is a rural municipality (RM) in the Canadian province of Saskatchewan within Census Division No. 2 and  Division No. 1.

History 
The RM of Hastings No. 66 was originally incorporated as a rural municipality on December 13, 1909. Its name was changed to the RM of Griffin No. 66 on January 30, 1910.

Geography

Communities and localities 
The following unincorporated communities are within the RM.

Special service areas
 Griffin

Localities
 Brough
 Froude
 Hume
 Huntoon

Demographics 

Government 
The RM of Griffin No. 66 is governed by an elected municipal council and an appointed administrator that meets on the second Tuesday of every month. The reeve of the RM is Stacey Lund while its administrator is Tawnya Moore. The RM's office is located in Griffin.

Transportation 
Rail
Weyburn-Stoughton Branch C.P.R. – serves Weyburn, Hume, Griffin, Froude, Stoughton
Boundary Subdivision C.N.R – serves Brough, Griffin, Innes, Huntoon, Viewfield.

Roads
Highway 13—serves Griffin, Saskatchewan East-west
Highway 606—serves Griffin, Saskatchewan North-south

See also 
List of rural municipalities in Saskatchewan

References 

G

Division No. 2, Saskatchewan